USS Shiloh may refer to the following ships of the United States Navy:

  was one of the first of the  monitors to be launched in the United States Navy.
  is a  guided missile cruiser

United States Navy ship names